The 2023 Gamba Osaka season is the club's 43rd season in existence and the tenth consecutive season in the top flight of Japanese football. In addition to the domestic league, Gamba Osaka are participating in the Emperor's Cup and the J.League Cup.

Players

Season squad

Transfers

Competitions

J1 League

League table

Results by round

Matches

Emperor's Cup

Gamba starts the competition in the second round, as every J1 and J2 Leagues' clubs earns a bye from prefectural qualification.

J.League Cup

Goalscorers 
Updated as of 11 March 2023.

References

External links
 Official website 

Gamba Osaka seasons
Gamba Osaka